David Muir (born 17 July 1971) is an Australian rules footballer who played for the Fremantle Dockers between 1995 and 1996.

He was originally drafted from Claremont in the WAFL to the West Coast Eagles for the 1993 season, before being delisted without playing a league game.  He was then drafted by the North Melbourne Football Club, where again he didn't play a league game and was delisted.  He was then selected as a predraft selection in the 1994 AFL Draft by Fremantle and played 20 games over two seasons mainly as a defender.

After retiring from football, Muir became a big-wave surfer and stand up paddle surfing. He won an event at Sapinus in Tahiti, and competed in the Stand Up World tour, finishing each year between 2010 and 2012 in the top twenty, with eighth place in 2010 his best overall result.

References

External links

1971 births
Fremantle Football Club players
Claremont Football Club players
Living people
Australian rules footballers from Western Australia
Australian surfers